Clusia is a genus of flies in the family Clusiidae. There are about 12 described species in Clusia.

Species
These 12 species belong to the genus Clusia.
Clusia ciliata Sasakawa, 1959
Clusia czernyi Johnson, 1913
Clusia flava Meigen, 1830
Clusia intermedialis Mamaev, 1974
Clusia japonica Sasakawa, 1957
Clusia lateralis (Walker, 1849)
Clusia occidentalis Malloch, 1918
Clusia okadomei Sasakawa, 1986
Clusia omogensis Sasakawa, 1965
Clusia sexlineata Frey, 1960
Clusia tigrina Fallén, 1820
Clusia unita Mamaev, 1974

References

Further reading

External links

 
 

Clusiidae
Schizophora genera